Sanabria (A Seabra in the Galician language, Senabria in Leonese language) is a comarca in the northwest of the province of Zamora, western Spain. It borders Portugal to the south, Orense to the west and León to the north. It belongs to the Autonomous Region of Castilla y León.

Overview 
The Sierra de la Cabrera Baja forms a natural boundary with Leon Province in the north, Sierra Segundera with Galicia in the west, and Sierra de la Culebra and Sierra de la Gamoneda with the Bragança District of Portugal in the south and southwest. The comarcas of La Carballeda and Tierra del Pan are to the east. The lake was declared a Natural Park in 1978. The capital of the comarca is Puebla de Sanabria.

The Sanabria comarca is one of the few areas of Western Europe with a sizeable population of wild wolves, which live in the Sierra de la Culebra mountain range.

Municipalities 
Sanabria is divided in 15 municipalities, which in turn include several districts or towns, of which some belong to the nearby region of La Carballeda. In the next table municipalities are listed, showing the area of each municipality in square kilometers, population according to the last INE census and the towns which are included on every municipality:

See also 

 Sierra de la Cabrera
 Peña Trevinca
 Moncalvo
 Galende

References

External links

 Sanabria and Carballeda
 Sanabria Tourist Guide
 Sanabria website

Comarcas of the Province of Zamora